WGJK (1360 AM, "K Country 99.5 92.7") is a radio station broadcasting a country music format. Licensed to Rome, Georgia, United States, the station serves the Rome GA area.  The station is currently owned by Woman's World and is in an LMA through Rome Radio Partners, LLC.

History
The station went on the air in 1964 as WIYN, becoming WRJY on May 30, 1988. On August 2, 1989, the station changed its call sign to WTSH and on April 25, 2005, to the current WGJK.

Previous logo

References

External links

FCC History Cards for WGJK

GJK